The 2009 European Speedway Club Champions' Cup will be the 12th UEM European Speedway Club Champions' Cup season. The Final take place on 19 September 2009 at the MotoArena Toruń in Toruń, Poland. The meeting was won by Kaskad Rivne who beat host time Unibax Toruń, Vostok Vladivostok and Simon & Wolf Debrecen.

Results

Heat details

Semi-final 

 18 July 2009 (16:30 UTC+3)
  Rivne, Rivnenskyy Mototrek (Length: 360 m)
 Referee:  P. Vana
 Jury President: None

The Final 

 19 September 2009 (19:00 UTC+2)
  Toruń, MotoArena Toruń (Length: 325 m)
 Referee:  Frank Ziegler
 Jury President:  Christer Bergstrom

See also 
 motorcycle speedway

References 

2009
European Club